The BBC Radio Theatre (originally named The Concert Hall) is a theatre situated within the BBC's Broadcasting House complex. It is used for live broadcast and audio recordings.

History 
Originally named The Concert Hall, the theatre was designed by George Val Myer as part of the BBC's new Broadcasting House building. Upon original specification, the hall had a reverberation time of 1.7 seconds.

Broadcasting House was opened on 14 May 1932 by Queen Mary. The theatre's first performance was held on 15 October 1932; at this time the hall's capacity allowed a large orchestra and an audience of 550. On 10 March 1933, the hall hosted a memorial concert to the BBC's former Director of Music, Percy Pitt.

In 1933, the BBC Yearbook described the hall's acoustics and architecture:

Val Myer's interior included extensive Art Deco fittings, an oak dado and bas-reliefs by Gilbert Bayes. The theatre's green room was designed by Raymond McGrath.

Upon the outbreak of the Second World War, part of the theatre was used as a dormitory. On 6 September 1939, Stuart Hibberd wrote that:

In 1966, the BBC commissioned a report into sound propagation between spaces inside Broadcasting House, entitled Acoustic Tests in Broadcasting House, London: The Anomalous Sound Transmission between Studio S2 and the Concert Hall. The investigation found that Studio S2—situated in the sub basement below the Concert Hall and used for small orchestras and pop groups—leaked sound into the auditorium above due to inadequate sound insulation and lack of a floating floor; this occasionally distracted musicians in the Concert Hall although it could not be heard on transmissions or recordings.

In 1994, the Concert Hall was renamed the Radio Theatre.

In 2012, a developmental Super Hi-Vision (8K) video system with 22.2 surround sound audio was installed in the theatre to show the London Olympics and its opening ceremony.

Organ 
On 16 June 1933, the BBC unveiled the Concert Hall's Compton organ. To celebrate the event, the corporation broadcast a concert featuring George Thalben-Ball, G. D. Cunningham, and Walter Alcock. The organ featured 2,826 pipes in 35 ranks.

Productions 
The BBC has recorded a number of comedy programmes in the theatre, including What's My Line?, Just a Minute, and I'm Sorry I Haven't a Clue.

Musical artists to have performed in the venue include David Bowie (for his Bowie at the Beeb album). The Radio 2 In Concert series is broadcast from the theatre; contributing artists include Stereophonics, Jeff Lynne's ELO, James Morrison, Emeli Sande, Ed Sheeran, and Paul Weller.

References 

Theatres in the City of Westminster
BBC offices, studios and buildings